Teseney Airport  is an airport serving Teseney, Eritrea. It has an asphalt runway of 2,330 meters.

See also
Transport in Eritrea

References                

 OurAirports - Eritrea
  Great Circle Mapper - Teseney
 Teseney
 Google Earth

Airports in Eritrea